Kursali may refer to:
 Ghursali, Armenia